Hibben is a surname. Notable people with the surname include:

Frank C. Hibben (1910–2002), American archaeologist
Gil Hibben (born 1935), American knife maker
Helene Hibben (1882–1969), American artist
John Grier Hibben (1861–1933), American Presbyterian minister, philosopher and educator
Paxton Hibben (1880–1928), American diplomat, journalist, writer and humanitarian
Samuel Hibben (1888–1972), American lighting designer
Sheila Hibben (1888–1964), American food writer